In baseball, an assist (denoted by A) is a defensive statistic, baseball being one of the few sports in which the defensive team controls the ball. An assist is credited to every defensive player who fields or touches the ball (after it has been hit by the batter) before the recording of a putout, even if the contact was unintentional. For example, if a ball strikes a player's leg and bounces off him to another fielder, who tags the baserunner, the first player is credited with an assist. A fielder can receive a maximum of one assist per out recorded. An assist is also credited if a putout would have occurred, had another fielder not committed an error. For example, a shortstop might field a ground ball cleanly, but the first baseman might drop his throw. In this case, an error would be charged to the first baseman, and the shortstop would be credited with an assist. Unlike putouts, exactly one of which is awarded for every defensive out, an out can result in no assists being credited (as in strikeouts, fly outs and line drives), or in assists being credited to multiple players (as in relay throws and rundown plays). The center fielder (CF) is one of the three outfielders, the defensive positions in baseball farthest from the batter. Center field is the area of the outfield directly in front of a person standing at home plate and facing beyond the pitcher's mound. The outfielders have to try to catch long fly balls before they hit the ground or to quickly catch or retrieve and return to the infield any other balls entering the outfield. Generally having the most territory to cover, the center fielder is usually the fastest of the three outfielders, although this can also depend on the relative strength of their throwing arms and the configuration of their home field, due to the deepest part of center field being the farthest point from the infield and home plate. The center fielder normally plays behind the shortstop and second baseman, who play in or near the infield; unlike catchers and most infielders (excepting first basemen), who are virtually exclusively right-handed, center fielders can be either right- or left-handed. In the scoring system used to record defensive plays, the center fielder is assigned the number 8.

Center fielders are most commonly credited with an assist when they throw the ball to an infielder who tags a runner attempting to advance on the basepaths, even on a caught fly ball that results in an out (see tag up); of special importance are throws to the catcher if the runner is trying to reach home plate to score a run, perhaps on a sacrifice fly. Center fielders will often record assists by throwing out runners who try to advance farther than the batter, such as going from first to third base on a single, or batter/runners who try to stretch a hit into a longer one. Center fielders also earn assists on relay throws to infielders after particularly deep fly balls, by throwing to a base to record an out on an appeal play, or in situations where they might deflect a fly ball before another defensive player makes the catch. Outfielders record far fewer assists than other players due to the difficulty of making an accurate throw in time to retire a runner from a great distance; middle infielders routinely record more assists in a single season than outfielders do in their entire careers. Assists are an important statistic for outfielders, giving a greater indication about an outfielder's throwing arm than assists by infielders do. In recent years, some sabermetricians have begun referring to assists by outfielders as baserunner kills.

The list of career leaders is dominated by players from the 1890s through 1920s, including the dead-ball era, due to that period's emphasis on more aggressive baserunning. The top six players were all active throughout the years from 1913 to 1921; only 11 of the top 37 players were active after 1953, and only six of them after 1984. Only six of the top 73 single-season totals were recorded after 1925, and only one after 1945; only nine of the top 163 have been recorded since 1955. Because game accounts and box scores often did not distinguish between the outfield positions, there has been some difficulty in determining precise defensive statistics before 1901; because of this, and because of the similarity in their roles, defensive statistics for the three positions are frequently combined. Although efforts to distinguish between the three positions regarding games played during this period and reconstruct the separate totals have been largely successful, separate assist totals are unavailable; players whose totals are missing the figures for pre-1901 games are notated in the table below. Tris Speaker is the all-time leader in career assists as a center fielder with 448, 173 more than any other player, and nearly two and a half times as many as any player active after 1931. Speaker also holds the single-season record of 35, which he accomplished twice; no player since 1955 has had more than 20, likely putting both of his marks among Major League Baseball's most unbreakable records. Andrew McCutchen, who had 63 assists through the 2022 season to place him tied for 105th all-time, is the leader among active players.

Key

List

Other Hall of Famers

References

External links

Major League Baseball statistics
Assists as a left outfielder